The Z111 Factory, formally registered as the 11 Precise Mechanical One Member Liability Company is a state-owned small arms factory located in Thanh Hoá, Vietnam.

The Z111 Factory was built in 1957, and was originally called "Z1 Factory". A part of this factory named Factory 1 was built by the Israeli firearms company, Israel Weapon Industries (IWI). It is wholly owned by the Vietnamese Ministry of Defence, and the factory produces arms for the People's Army of Vietnam.

History
Built in 1957 under the name "Z1 Factory", the factory became a cradle of the small arms industry in Vietnam. Z1 factory specialized in producing small arms for the Vietnam People's Army during the Vietnam War, and created locally modified firearms for its army, such as the K-50M submachine gun based on the PPSh-41 and MAT-49.

One of the weapons to come from the Z111 Factory is the M18, reconditioned since 2010 from XM177E2s seized during the Vietnam War. They are known to be used by Vietnamese special forces personnel and officers from the Vietnam Coast Guard due to its compact size.

On February 3, 2014, IWI entered into an agreement with Vietnam to produce the IWI ACE under license. Production was made in a joint production facility.

An improved version of the K-54 pistol is locally produced under the name of "K14-VN". They are upgraded with an increased capacity of 13 rounds, and a wider grip to incorporate a double stack magazine. Research and development started in 2001. The K14-VN began to see service with PAVN forces on May 10, 2014.

In 2015, the Z111 Factory announced that they would produce the new STL-1A rifle. This would mainly be done through converting and upgrading the old AKMs under the new name, but they would also produce entirely new STL-1A rifles. The updated rifle included: New polymer handguards, a folding buttstock, a new ergonomic pistol grip, and an updated muzzle brake similar to those found on the AK-74. A notable change was that it also allowed the use of M203 grenade launchers that are also being produced in Vietnam, replacing the GP-25/GP-34 grenade launchers on the original AKMs. The rifle however, still uses the dovetail side-mount for attaching sights. Overall, the rifle highly resembles an AK-103.

In January 2018, the OSV-96 was reported to be made under license in Vietnam.

In 2019, the factory revealed the new STV Rifles. They are the STV-215, and the STV-380. Both of them were designated to be the new standard issued rifles for the Vietnam People's Army. IWI Jericho 941 pistols were also reported being manufactured.

In 2020, the factory revealed two more variants of the STV rifles, called the STV-410 and the STV-416.

Products

See also 

 List of equipment of the Vietnam People's Ground Forces

Notes

References

Military installations of the Socialist Republic of Vietnam
Buildings and structures in Thanh Hóa province
Defence companies of Vietnam
Manufacturing plants
Vietnamese companies established in 1957
Government-owned companies of Vietnam